Jean Noël Hallé (2 January 1754 – 11 February 1822) was a French physician born in Paris. He was the son of painter Noël Hallé (1711–1781).

He was a professor of physical medicine and health at the École de Santé, and afterwards a professor at the Collège de France. He was a member of the French Académie Nationale de Médecine, and in 1795 was elected to the Académie des sciences, becoming its president in 1813. He also served as "first-physician" to Napoleon Bonaparte.

Hallé was a pioneer of hygienic reform in France, and was a catalyst towards educating others as to its importance. He created distinctions between public and individual hygiene, and initiated studies and awareness involving the multiple issues that involve hygiene, such as contagious diseases, health in the workplace, and problems associated with living in a high density urban environment, to name a few.

He was co-editor of the 1813 "Code des médicaments" (a work involving French pharmacopoeia), and made contributions to the "Dictionnaire des Sciences médicales" (Dictionary of Medical Sciences). He also carried out investigations of breast cancer, conducted research on the effects of camphor, and was a major advocate of vaccination.

In 1794 he came to the defense of Antoine Lavoisier (1743–1794), when the latter was tried for treason before the National Convention.

References 
 This article is based on a translation of an equivalent article at the French Wikipedia.
 Diseases of civilisation by John Powles

1754 births
1822 deaths
Hygienists
Physicians from Paris
19th-century French physicians
18th-century French physicians
Academic staff of the Collège de France
Members of the French Academy of Sciences
Burials at Père Lachaise Cemetery